Sabayevo (Sabay) is a rural locality (a village) in Uryadinsky Selsoviet, Mishkinsky District, Bashkortostan, Russia. The population was 216 as of 2010. There are 4 streets.

Geography 
Sabayevo is located 21 km south of Mishkino (the district's administrative centre) by road. Kochkildino is the nearest rural locality.

References 

Rural localities in Mishkinsky District